Ankita Bhargava Patel also known as Ankita Karan Patel born on 17 August 1984 is an Indian television actress. She is known for playing Princess Unnati in Dekha Ek Khwaab, Latika in Ek Nayi Pehchaan, Shipra in Star Plus's Kasautii Zindagii Kay by Ekta Kapoor and many more television shows.
She has done more than 50 ad films and has done prominent roles in films like Akira and Action Jackson.
She is daughter of television actors Abhay Bhargava and Kiran Bhargava.

Personal life 

Ankita married Karan Patel on 3 May 2015 in Mumbai. Their first child was born on 14 December 2019.

Career

Ankita appeared first in the 15th Episode of STAR Plus's series Sanjivani in 2002. She gained popularity for playing character Shipra  in Star Plus's Kasautii Zindagii Kay by Ekta Kapoor.

Television

Filmography

References

External links 

 
 
 

1981 births
Living people
Indian television actresses
Actors from Mumbai